Constantinos A. Doxiadis (14 May 1913 – 28 June 1975), often cited as C. A. Doxiadis, was a Greek architect and urban planner. During the 1960s, he was the lead architect and planner of Islamabad, which was to serve as the new capital city of Pakistan. He was later known as the father of ekistics, which concerns the multi-aspect science of human settlements.

Theories
Doxiadis is the father of "ekistics", which concerns the science of human settlements, including regional, city, community planning and dwelling design. The term was coined by Doxiadis in 1942 and a major incentive for the development of the science is the emergence of increasingly large and complex settlements, tending to regional conurbations and even to a worldwide city. However, ekistics attempts to encompass all scales of human habitation and seeks to learn from the archaeological and historical record by looking not only at great cities, but, as much as possible, at the total settlement pattern.

Doxiadis also coined the term entopia, coming from the Greek words έν ("in") and τόπος ("place"). He quoted "What human beings need is not utopia ('no place') but entopia ('in place') a real city which they can build, a place which satisfies the dreamer and is acceptable to the scientist, a place where the projections of the artist and the builder merge."

Influence 
In the 1960s and 1970s, urban planner and architect Constantinos Doxiadis authored books, studies, and reports including those regarding the growth potential of the Great Lakes Megalopolis.  At the peak of his popularity, in the 1960s, he addressed the US Congress on the future of American cities, his portrait illustrated the front cover of Time magazine, his company Doxiadis Associates was implementing large projects in housing, urban and regional development in more than 40 countries, his Computer Centre (UNIVAC-DACC) was at the cutting edge of the computer technology of his time and at his annual "Delos Symposium" the World Society of Ekistics attracted the worlds foremost thinkers and experts.

In Greece, he faced persistent suspicion and opposition and his recommendations were largely ignored. Having won two large contracts (National Regional Plan for Greece and Master Plan for Athens) from the Greek Junta he was criticised by competitors, after its fall in 1974, portrayed as a friend of the colonels. His visions for Athens airport to be constructed on the adjacent island of Makronissos, where political prisoners were held, together with a bridge, a rail link and a port at Lavrion were never realised.

His influence had already diminished at his death in 1975, as he was unable to speak for the last two years of his life, a victim of amyotrophic lateral sclerosis (ALS). His company Doxiadis Associates changed owners several times after his death, the heir to his computer company remained but without any links to planning or ekistics. The Delos Symposium was discontinued, and the World Society of Ekistics is today an obscure organisation.

Works about Doxiadis have appeared in the Museum of Brisbane, Milani Gallery, Brisbane and feature in the To Speak of Cities exhibition at the University of Queensland Art Museum.

Works

One of his best-known town planning works is Islamabad. Designed as a new city it was fully realised, unlike many of his other proposals in already existing cities, where shifting political and economic forces did not allow full implementation of his plans. The plan for Islamabad, separates cars and people, allows easy and affordable access to public transport and utilities and permits low cost gradual expansion and growth without losing the human scale of his "communities".

In Riyadh, Doxiadis reoriented the city on a southwest-northeast axis, rendering "the planned city... similar to an immense mosque facing Mecca." His work was also part of the architecture event in the art competition at the 1936 Summer Olympics.

The Sacrifices of Greece in the Second World War (exhibit, San Francisco City Hall, 1945)
 Sadr City of Baghdad, Iraq (1959)
 Master Plan of Islamabad, The capital of Pakistan;1960
 Master Plan for Skopje, city reconstruction plan following a major earthquake 1963.
 Teacher-Student Centre (TSC), University of Dhaka, Bangladesh; 1961
 Plan Doxiadis, Rio de Janeiro, 1965.

Awards 
His awards and decorations are as follows:

 Greek War Cross, for his services during the war of 1940-41 (1941) 
 Order of the British Empire, for his activities in the Greek Resistance and for his collaboration with the Allied Forces, Middle East (1945)
 Order of the Cedar of Lebanon, for his contribution to the development of Lebanon (1958)
 Order of the Phoenix for his contribution to the development of Greece (1960)
 Sir Patrick Abercrombie Prize of the International Union of Architects (1963)
 Cali de Oro (Mexican Gold Medal) Award of the Society of Mexican Architects (1963)
 Award of Excellence,  Industrial Designers Society of America (1965)
 Aspen Award for the Humanities (1966)
 Order of the Yugoslav Flag with Golden Wreath (1966)

Publications by Doxiadis

Books

Journal articles

Publications on Doxiadis
 Kyrtsis, Alexandros-Andreas (2006). Constantinos A. Doxiadis: Texts, Design Drawings, Settlements. Athens: Ikaros

See also

 Apostolos Doxiadis
 Settlement hierarchy

Notes

References

External links

 Doxiadis Foundation
 Center for Spatially Integrated Social Science
 An arieal view of a portion of Islamabad whose planning Doxiadis was involved with.
 Doxiadis on YouTube
 Doxiadis Associates
·

Greek urban planners
1913 births
1975 deaths
Urban theorists
Knights of the National Order of the Cedar
People from Asenovgrad
National Technical University of Athens alumni
Technical University of Berlin alumni
Neurological disease deaths in Greece
Deaths from motor neuron disease
20th-century Greek architects
Bulgarian people of Greek descent
Olympic competitors in art competitions
Recipients of the War Cross (Greece)
Recipients of the Order of the Phoenix (Greece)
Greek Resistance members
Bulgarian emigrants to Greece